Oligobalia is a genus of moths belonging to the family Tortricidae.

Species
Oligobalia viettei Diakonoff, 1988

See also
List of Tortricidae genera

References

 , 1988: Tortricidae from Madagascar. Part 2. Olethreutinae, 3 (Lepidoptera). Annales de la Société Entomologique de France (N.S.) 24 (2): 161-180 (162).
 , 2011: Diagnoses and remarks on genera of Tortricidae, 2: Cochylini (Lepidoptera: Tortricidae). Shilap Revista de Lepidopterologia 39 (156): 397–414.

External links
tortricidae.com

Cochylini
Tortricidae genera